Scott Montgomery (born October 16, 1981) is a poker player from Perth, Ontario, Canada who won his first bracelet at the 2010 World Series of Poker in the $1,000 No-Limit Hold’em Event #36 and was one of the final table players in the 2008 World Series of Poker Main Event. He finished in fifth place earning $3,088,012, which was his fourth cash in the 2008 WSOP. Eastgate had pocket sixes. Montgomery got an ace on the flop and another on the turn. Eastgate hit his card, giving him a full house and eliminating Montgomery.

Montgomery also has two World Poker Tour cashes, including a fifth-place finish at the 2008 L.A. Poker Classic, which earned him $296,860.

World Series of Poker bracelet 

As of 2010, his total lifetime live poker tournament winnings exceed $4,000,000. His 14 cashes at the WSOP account for $3,712,688 of those winnings.

References

External links 
 WSOP profile

Canadian poker players
1981 births
Living people
World Series of Poker bracelet winners